The Miracle of Shame is an EP by the Berkeley, California punk rock band The Mr. T Experience, released in 2000 by Lookout! Records. It is the band's only release to include bassist Gabe Meline as an official member, though he had previously recorded with the band in a studio capacity on the 1999 album Alcatraz. Meline replaced bassist Joel Reader, who left the group after the recording of Alcatraz. The Miracle of Shame also includes Erik Noyes on hammond organ, who had recorded with the band on Revenge is Sweet, and So Are You and Alcatraz but had never been an official member. He joined the band officially for touring in the Summer of 1999 but did not stay with the group long.

Track listing

Performers
Dr. Frank - vocals, guitar
Gabe Meline - bass
Erik Noyes - hammond organ
Jim "Jym" Pittman - drums

Album information
Produced, engineered, and mixed by Kevin Army
Recorded at Sharkbite Studios, Foxhound Studios, and Peace and Conflict Studios in Oakland, California
Mastered by John Golden
Artwork by Chris Appelgren

The Mr. T Experience EPs
2000 EPs